Granny (born c. 1951, died c. 2016), also known as J2, was an orca (killer whale). Early estimates placed her birth in 1911, which would have meant she was 105 years old at the time of her death. However, this estimate was later revealed to have been based on mistaken information. More recent studies put her at 65-80 years old. If she was 105, she would have been the oldest known orca at the time of her death.  A member of the endangered southern resident killer whale population, Granny lived in the northeast Pacific Ocean and coastal bays of Washington state and British Columbia.  She was last seen on October 12, 2016, and was considered deceased by The Center for Whale Research in January 2017.

Description

Granny was recognizable from the gray "saddle patch" just behind her dorsal fin, and a half-moon notch in her fin. Simon Pidcock of Ocean EcoVentures said he had seen Granny thousands of times, and that the markings on orca fins were like fingerprints.

Granny had been captured with the rest of her pod in 1967 but was too old at that time for a marine mammal park and so was released.

Now that orca studies have been conducted for several decades, the exact age of many younger whales is known. The age of older orcas, such as Granny, is estimated by their offspring; they give birth around age 15, and stop having offspring around 40; by adding the generations together, ages can be estimated. Granny was photographed in 1971 with a male orca, J1 Ruffles, who was believed at the time to be her son. Ruffles was estimated as at least 20 years old, and as scientists believed him to be Granny's last offspring, her own age was estimated at about 60. It was later discovered that Ruffles was not Granny's son, but her age estimate was never changed. Granny's age was originally estimated with a margin of error of 12 years, but was the subject of an academic dispute in 2016 due to her original age being based on evidence now known to be incorrect, as well as a large disparity between the life expectancy of orcas with estimated ages and orcas with known ages. Analysis of fatty acids from a recent biopsy of Granny indicated that Granny may have only been 65–80 years of age.

J pod
Granny, along with several of her descendants, travelled in the J pod, a group of about 25 orcas. J pod, along with Pods K and L, are the "J clan", which constitute the entire southern resident killer whale population. They frequent the inland waters of British Columbia and Washington state in the summer months, but roam from southeast Alaska to central California. As the oldest female in J pod, Granny would have been considered its leader.

A well-known male orca previously thought to be Granny's son is J1 Ruffles. He was last seen in 2010. As of 2012, none of Granny's immediate children are known to be living.  However, Granny had multiple grandchildren and great-grandchildren who travelled in the pod with her.

The southern resident killer whales are the most studied population of orcas in the world. Many whales in this population were captured in the 1960s and 1970s for use in sea parks, and others were killed by hunters attempting to capture them. The southern resident orcas are the smallest of four resident communities from the Northeastern portion of the Pacific Ocean.  It is the only orca population listed as endangered by the U.S. Fish & Wildlife Service, and as of 2005 this group is protected under the Endangered Species Act.

Legacy
As the longest living known orca, Granny is employed as an example in arguments against keeping whales in captivity, referencing the allegedly reduced lifespan of captive animals. The oldest orca in captivity is the 56-year-old Corky who currently resides at SeaWorld San Diego. The average lifespan for a captured orca is 20 to 30 years.

Granny was also used as a focal point of environmental efforts that resulted in the Endangered Species Act protections for orca. Environmentalists estimate that Granny may have had a PCB load of up to 100 parts per million, and that her descendants' reproductive systems may have been damaged by exposure to pollution. Additionally, declining West Coast salmon populations put Granny and her family at risk.

Granny was featured in a children's book on orcas by Sally Hodson titled Granny's Clan: A Tale of Wild Orcas.

Shortly after Granny's death was announced, BBC Radio 4's Inside Science discussed the insights into killer whales and their social lives which the prolonged observations of Granny and her pod had revealed.

Granny is the subject of a short documentary film. The Hundred Year Old Whale was released in 2017 by filmmaker Mark Leiren-Young, the author of The Killer Whale Who Changed The World.

Orca lifespan

Estimates of lifespans for wild orcas vary. SeaWorld says wild lifespans are 30–50 years for females, and 19–30 years for males. These estimates depart from the findings of a 2005 study, which pegged the mean age of females at 45.8 years and males at 31.0 during the period between 1973 and 1996. Marine conservation groups argue that even these estimates are low due to the effects of hunting, pollution, and capture on the wild populations, and that natural wild orca lifespans are equivalent to that of humans, with male orcas living up to 75 years and female orcas living up to 80 years.

Orcas are one of the few species to exhibit menopause and Granny's great age gave her a chance to use her skills to enhance the reproductive success of her offspring (see Grandmother hypothesis).

See also
 List of individual cetaceans

References

1950s animal births
2016 animal deaths
Individual orcas
Individual wild animals
Oldest animals
Southern resident orcas